Gisela Bock (born 1942 in Karlsruhe, Germany) is a German historian. She studied in Freiburg, Berlin, Paris and Rome. She took her doctorate at the Free University Berlin in 1971 (on early modern intellectual history in Italy) and her Habilitation at the Technical University Berlin in 1984. She has taught at the Free University Berlin (1971–1983) and was professor at the European University Institute (1985–1989) in Florence, Italy, at the University of Bielefeld (1989–1997) and then at the Free University Berlin. She retired in 2007.

In the 1970s, Bock was active in the international campaign for "wages for/against housework" and was one of the pioneers in the emergence and establishment of "women and gender" history. She was a co-founder of the International Federation for Research in Women's History (1987). Bock's best known works are her theoretical articles on gender history and the volume Women in European History (all published in many languages).

Published only in German, her 1986 book,  (Compulsory Sterilization in National Socialism), was a study of the 400,000 compulsory sterilizations performed in Nazi Germany on "genetically inferior" men and women. Bock examined the history of sterilization in Nazi Germany with respect to the perpetrators as well as the victims, both women and men. She showed how the treatment and the experience of male and female victims were both similar and different, and she argued that Nazi gender policy was shaped by Nazi racism just as Nazi race policy was shaped by gender. Bock also examined the Nazi sterilization policy as an integral part of the regime's population policy as well as a prelude to Nazi genocide.

Works
German
, Tübingen: Niemeyer, 1974.
 München: Trikont, 1976. 
, Opladen: Westdeutscher Verlag, 1986. Reprint 2010.
, München:C.H.Beck 2000, 2005.
 (edited with Margarete Zimmermann), Stuttgart; Weimar: Metzler, 1997.
(editor), Frankfurt am Main/New York: Campus 2005.
edited with Daniel Schönpflug, Stuttgart 2006.
edited with Gerhard A. Ritter, München: Oldenbourg Wissenschaftsverlag 2012

English
"Women's History and Gender History: Aspects of an International Debate," in Gender and History, Volume 1, 1989, pp. 7–30.
co-edited with Quentin Skinner and Maurizio Viroli, Machiavelli and Republicanism, Cambridge University Press 1990.
co-edited with Pat Thane, Maternity and Gender Policies: Women and the Rise of the European Welfare States, 1880s–1950s, London 1991.
co-edited with Susan James, Beyond Equality and Difference: Citizenship, Feminist Politics and Female Subjectivity, London 1992. 
Women in European history Oxford; Malden, Mass.: Blackwell, 2002.
"Challenging Dichotomies: Perspectives on Women's History." In Writing Women's History: International Perspectives, ed. Karen Offen, Ruth Roach Pierson, and Jane Rendall, Bloomington: Indiana University Press, pp. 1–23.
Ordinary Women in Nazi Germany: Perpetrators, Victims, Followers, and Bystanders. In Women in the Holocaust, ed. Dalia Ofer and Lenore J. Weitzman, New Haven & London 1998, pp. 85–100.

References
Usborne, Cornelie "Bock, Gisela" in Encyclopedia of Historians edited by Kelly Boyd, Volume 1, London: Fitzroy Dearborn Publishers, 1999, pp. 98–100.

1942 births
Living people
Historians of Nazism
Feminist historians
20th-century German historians
Academic staff of the European University Institute
German women historians
Women's historians
Writers from Karlsruhe
Officers Crosses of the Order of Merit of the Federal Republic of Germany
German expatriates in Italy
German expatriates in France
21st-century German historians